Ring finger protein 19B is a protein that in humans is encoded by the RNF19B gene.

Function

This gene encodes a multi-pass membrane protein containing two RING-type and one IBR-type zinc finger motifs. The encoded protein is an E3 ubiquitin-protein ligase that plays a role in the cytotoxic effects of natural killer (NK) cells. Alternative splicing results in multiple transcript variants. There are pseudogenes for this gene on chromosomes X and Y in a possible pseudoautosomal region.

References

Further reading